Dodangeh Rural District is a rural district (dehestan) in the Central District of Behbahan County, Khuzestan Province, Iran. At the 2006 census, its population was 14,601, in 2,863 families.  The rural district has 36 villages.

References 

Rural Districts of Khuzestan Province
Behbahan County